Hooghly district is one of the districts of the Indian state of West Bengal. It can alternatively be spelt Hoogli or Hugli. The district is named after the Hooghly River.

The headquarters of the district are at Hooghly-Chinsura (Chuchura). There are four subdivisions: Chinsurah Sadar, Srirampore, Chandannagore, and Arambagh.

History 
The district of Hooghly derived its name from the town of Hooghly on the west bank of the Hugli River about 40 km north of Kolkata. This town was a major river port for trade in India before colonialism.

The district has thousands of years of rich heritage as part of the Bengali kingdom of Bhurshut. The first European to reach this area was the Portuguese sailor Vasco da Gama. In 1536 Portuguese traders obtained a permit from Sultan Mahmud Shah to trade in this area. In those days the Hooghly River was the main route for transportation and Hooghly served as an excellent trading port.

Within a few decades, the town of Hooghly turned into a major commercial centre and the largest port in Bengal. Later in 1579–80 Mughal emperor Akbar gave permission to a Portuguese captain Pedro Tavares to establish a city anywhere in the Bengal province. They chose Hooghly, and it became the first European settlement in Bengal. In 1599 the Portuguese traders built a convent and a church in Bandel. This is the first Christian church in Bengal known as ‘Bandel Church’ today.

The Portuguese traders started slave trading, robbery and converting natives into Christians by pressure. At one point they stopped paying taxes to the Mughal Empire. As a result, Emperor Shah Jahan ordered the then-ruler of Bengal province, Qasim Khan Juvayni, to block the city of Hooghly. This led to a war in which the Portuguese were defeated.

Among other European powers that came to Hooghly were the Dutch, the Danish, the British, the French, the Belgians and the Germans. Dutch traders centred their activities in the town Chuchura which is south of Hooghly. Chandannagar became the base of the French and the city remained under their control from 1816 to 1950. Similarly, the Danish establishment in settlement in Serampore (1755). All these towns are on the west bank of the Hooghly River and served as ports. Among these European countries, the British ultimately became most powerful.

Initially the British were based in and around the city of Hooghly like traders from other countries. In 1690 Job Charnock decided to shift the British trading centre from Hooghly-Chinsura to Calcutta. The reason behind this decision was the strategically safe location of Calcutta and its proximity to the Bay of Bengal. As a result, trade and commerce in the Bengal province shifted from the town of Hooghly to Calcutta. Hooghly lost its importance as Calcutta prospered.

After the Battle of Buxar this region was brought under direct British rule until India's independence in 1947. After independence, this district merged into the state of West Bengal.

Though the city of Hooghly is more than 500 years old, the district of Hooghly was formed in 1795 with the city of Hooghly as its headquarters. Later the headquarters shifted to the town of Chuchura. In 1843 the Howrah district was created from the southern portion of this district. And in 1872, the south-west portion of this district was merged into the Medinipur district. The last change in area occurred in 1966.

Tarakeswar Temple 
The Taraknath Temple, dedicated to the Hindu god Shiva worshiped as Taraknath, is a major pilgrimage spot in the town of Tarakeswar. Built in 1729, the temple is an ‘atchala’ structure of Bengal temple architecture with a ‘natmandir’ in front. Close by are the shrines of Kali and Lakshmi Narayan. Dudhpukur, a tank to the north of the Shiva temple is believed to fulfil the prayers of those taking a dip in it.

Pilgrims visit the temple throughout the year, especially on Mondays. Thousands of pilgrims visit Tarakeswar on the occasions of Shivaratri and ‘Gajan’, the former taking place in Phalgun (Feb-March) while the latter lasts for five days ending on the last day of Chaitra (mid-April). The month of Sravana (mid-July to mid-August) is seen to be auspicious for Shiva when celebrations are held on each Monday.

Geography 
The district is flat, with no place having an elevation of more than 200 meters. The River Hooghly borders it to the east. Another major river is the Damodar.

The district is bordered by Howrah District to the south, Bardhaman District to the north, and to the east by the River Hooghly. Bankura District lies to the north-west, with Medinipur District to the south-west.

Economy 
Hooghly is one of the most economically developed districts in West Bengal. It is the main jute cultivation, jute industry, and jute trade hub in the state. The jute mills are along the banks of the river Hooghly in Tribeni, Bhadreswar, Champdani and Sreerampur.

There are a number of industrial complexes including one of the largest car manufacturing plants in India, the Hindustan Motors plant in Uttarpara.

It was also home to the Singur Tata Nano controversy. Hindustan Motors plant was closed in 2014.
Bandel Thermal power plant and Tribeni tissue plant (ITC) are running smoothly.

Divisions

Administrative subdivisions 

The district comprises four subdivisions: Chinsurah, Chandannagore, Srirampore and Arambagh.
 Chinsurah subdivision consists of two municipalities (Hugli-Chuchura and Bansberia) and five community development blocs: Balagarh, Chinsurah–Mogra, Dhaniakhali, Pandua and Polba–Dadpur.
 Chandannagore subdivision consists of Chandannagar municipal corporation and three municipalities (Bhadreswar, Champdani and Tarakeswar) and three community development blocs: Haripal, Singur and Tarakeswar.
 Srirampore subdivision consists of six municipalities (Serampore, Uttarpara Kotrung, Dankuni, Konnagar, Rishra and Baidyabati) and four community development blocks: Chanditala–I, Chanditala–II, Jangipara and Sreerampur Uttarpara.
 Arambagh subdivision consists of Arambag municipality and six community development blocks: Arambag, Khanakul–I, Khanakul–II, Goghat–I, Goghat–II and Pursurah.

Hugli-Chuchura is the district headquarters. There are 23 police stations, 18 development blocks, 12 municipalities and 207 gram panchayats in this district.

Other than municipality area, each subdivision contains community development blocks that are divided into rural areas and census towns. There are 41 urban units: 12 municipalities and 64 census towns.

Chinsurah subdivision 
 Two municipalities: Hugli-Chinsurah and Bansberia
 Balagarh community development block consists of rural areas with 13 gram panchayats and four census towns: Jirat, Sripur, Badhagachhi, Mirdhanga.
 Chinsurah–Mogra community development block consists of rural areas with 10 gram panchayats and eight census towns: Kodalia, Raghunathpur, Madhusudanpur, Amodghata, Shankhanagar, Chak Bansberia, Kulihanda, Simla.
 Dhaniakhali community development block consists of rural areas only with 18 gram panchayats.
 Pandua community development block consists of rural areas with 15 gram panchayats and three census towns: Boinchi, Pandua and Batika.
 Polba–Dadpur community development block consists of rural areas only with 12 gram panchayats.

Chandannagore subdivision 
 Chandannagar municipal corporation
 Three municipalities: Bhadreswar, Champdani, and Tarakeswar
 Haripal community development block consists of rural areas only with 15 gram panchayats one census town: Bargachhia.
 Singur community development block consists of rural areas with 16 gram panchayats and one census town: Singur.
 Tarakeswar community development block consists of rural areas only with 10 gram panchayats.

Srirampore subdivision 
 Six municipalities: Serampore, Uttarpara Kotrung, Konnagar, Rishra, Dankuni and Champdani
 Chanditala–I community development block consists of rural areas only with 9 gram panchayats and 2 census towns: Masat, Gangadharpur, Aniya, Bhagabatipur, Haripur, Krishnarampur, Kumirmorah, Nawabpur, Sheakhala.
 Chanditala–II community development block consists of rural areas with 11 gram panchayats and 10 census towns: Purba Tajpur, Kharsarai, Begampur, Chikrand, Pairagachha, Monoharpur, Barijhati, Garalgachha, Krishnapur and Mrigala.
 Jangipara community development block consists of rural areas only with 10 gram panchayats.
 Sreerampur Uttarpara community development block consists of rural areas with six gram panchayats and six census towns: Raghunathpur, Dakshin Rajyadharpur, Bamunari, Rishra, Nabagram and Kanaipur.

Arambagh subdivision 
 One municipality: Arambag.
 Arambag community development block consists of rural areas only with 15 gram panchayats.
 Khanakul–I community development block consists of rural areas only with 13 gram panchayats.
 Khanakul–II community development block consists of rural areas only with 11 gram panchayats.
 Goghat–I community development block consists of rural areas only with 8 gram panchayats.
 Goghat–II community development block consists of rural areas only with 9 gram panchayats.
 Pursurah community development block consists of rural areas only with 8 gram panchayats.

Blocks map

Assembly constituencies 
The district is divided into 18 assembly constituencies:
 Jangipara (assembly constituency no. 177),
 Chanditala (assembly constituency no. 178),
 Uttarpara (assembly constituency no. 179),
 Serampore (assembly constituency no. 180),
 Champdani (assembly constituency no. 181),
 Chandernagore (assembly constituency no. 189),
 Singur (assembly constituency no. 183),
 Haripal (assembly constituency no. 184),
 Tarakeswar (assembly constituency no. 185),
 Chinsurah (assembly constituency no. 186),
 Saptagram (assembly constituency no. 187),
 Balagarh (SC) (assembly constituency no. 188),
 Pandua (assembly constituency no. 189),
 Dhaniakhali (SC) (assembly constituency no. 191),
 Pursurah (assembly constituency no. 192),
 Khanakul  (assembly constituency no. 202),
 Arambagh (assembly constituency no. 194) and
 Goghat (SC) (assembly constituency no. 195).
12
Balagarh, Dhaniakhali, Khanakul and Goghat constituencies are reserved for Scheduled Castes (SC) candidates. Along with two assembly constituencies from Howrah district, Jangipara, Chanditala, Uttarpara, Serampore and Champdani constituencies form the Serampore (Lok Sabha constituency). Chandernagore, Singur, Haripal, Chinsurah, Bansberia, Polba and Dhaniakhali constituencies form the Hooghly (Lok Sabha constituency).

Tarakeswar, Pursurah, Khankul, Arambag and Goghat constituencies are part of the Arambagh (Lok Sabha constituency), which contains two assembly segments in Paschim Medinipur district. Balagarh and Pandua constituencies are part of the Katwa (Lok Sabha constituency), which contains five assembly constituency from Bardhaman district.

As per order of the Delimitation Commission in respect of the delimitation of constituencies in the West Bengal, the district will be divided into 18 assembly constituencies:

Balagarh, Dhanekhali, Arambag and Goghat constituencies will be reserved for Scheduled Castes (SC) candidates. Along with two assembly constituencies from Howrah district, Uttarpara, Sreerampur, Champdani, Chanditala and Jangipara constituencies will form the Sreerampur (Lok Sabha constituency). Singur, Chandannagar, Chunchura, Balagarh, Pandua, Saptagram and Dhanekhali constituencies will form the Hooghly (Lok Sabha constituency). Haripal, Tarakeswar, Pursurah, Arambag, Goghat and Khankul constituencies will be part of the Arambag (Lok Sabha constituency), which will contain one assembly segment in Paschim Medinipur district.

Police administration 
Hooghly District comes under Burdwan Police Range. Hooghly Rural Police District was created on 30 June 2017, curbing out of erstwhile Hooghly district. Presently it consists of sixteen police station with jurisdiction, one women police station and one Cyber Police Station. The head quarter of Hooghly Rural Police District was shifted to Kamarkundu under Singur PS from Chinsura. 
Chandannagar Police Commissionerate was formed after bifurcation of the Hooghly Police District, and has nine police stations under its jurisdiction  established on 30 June 2017, is a police force with primary responsibilities in law enforcement and investigation within certain urban parts of Hooghly district. The Commissionerate is part of the West Bengal Police, and comes under the Department of Home & Hill Affairs, Government of West Bengal.

For the functioning of 23 police stations of the district, District Intelligence Branch, District Enforcement Branch and District Reserve Police Force SP, Hooghly is assisted by three additional superintendents:
 HQ: Having his office at Chinsurah, he looks after the Sadar Sub-Division and District Police Force, being assisted by Dy.S.P. (HQ) and Dy.S.P. (D&T).
 Industrial: He is in Serampore. He is the supervising officer for Serampore and Chandernagore Sub Divisions, assisted by SDPO: Serampore and SDPO: Chandernagore.
 Rural: He is in Arambagh and is the supervising officer for Arambagh Sub Division; being assisted by SDPO: Arambagh.

Transport

Rail 
The railway communication of the district, especially at the suburban area, is very developed.

There are four junction stations in Hooghly:
 Bandel Junction railway station
 Dankuni Junction railway station
 Sheoraphuli railway station
 Kamarkundu
The railway is under Howrah Division. The Howrah – New Delhi Rajdhani Route passes through the district, which is one of the most important routes of the country. This route comes under Howrah division and is under the jurisdiction of Sr Den/2/Hwh assisted by AEN/2/LLH. The first train of ER started its journey from Howrah to Hooghly on 14 August 1854 (First halt was Bally (Howrah) and second halt was Serampore). Hooghly station was announced as the heritage station.

Chinsurah and Tarakeswar railway stations are very useful.

Bus 

There are several bus stands in Hooghly district, of the main four bus stands are Chinsurah, Serampore, Tarakeswar, Arambagh. Other small bus stand including Kamarpukur, Dashghara, Dankuni, Champadanga, Garer Ghat, Badanganj, Haripal, Jangipara, Balideaonganj, Bandar present in Hooghly district.

Tarakeswar is the largest bus terminus of Hooghly. It has bus connection with several districts of West Bengal. Express Buses bound Bankura, Barddhaman, Durgapur, Sonamukhi, Tamluk, Bolpur, Khatra, Kharagpur, Digha, Medinipur, Haldia, Panskura, Jhargram, Katwa, Krishnanagar, Nabadwip, Kalna and many more destination are available from Tarakeswar bus stand. There is also many local bus route like 12, 13, 16, 17, 20, 22, 23 from Tarakeswar that covers Hooghly and some other districts.

Chinsurah is one of the largest bus terminus of Hooghly. Several local bus route bound Rishra, Memari, Jirat, Tarakeswar, Haripal, Jangipara are available.

Arambagh is another important bus stand of this district. Buses bound Tarakeswar, Kolkata, Kamarpukur, Badanganj, Kotulpur, Khanakul, Barddhaman are available.

Demographics 
According to the 2011 census Hooghly district has a population of 5,519,145, roughly equal to the nation of Denmark or the US state of Wisconsin. This gives it a ranking of 16th in India (out of a total of 640).

Its population growth rate over the decade 2001–2011 was 9.49%. Hugli has a sex ratio of 958 females for every 1000 males, and a literacy rate of 82.55%. Scheduled Castes and Scheduled Tribes make up 24.35% and 4.15% of the population respectively.

Religion 

Hindus are the majority community in the district. Muslims are the largest minority, concentrated more in rural areas.

Language

At the time of the 2011 census, 87.49% of the population spoke Bengali, 7.59% Hindi, 2.37% Santali and 1.72% Urdu as their first language. Hindi and Urdu speakers are predominantly found in urban areas.

Education 

There are 2992 primary schools, 408 high schools, 127 higher secondary schools, 22 colleges, and 6 technical institutes in Hooghly district.

The most notable institutions among them are:
 Badanganj High School (H.S.),[BADANGANJ : HOOGHLY: PIN-712122] Estd.1910
 Hooghly Collegiate School, Estd. 1812
Pearl Rosary School, Estd. 2005
 Hooghly Mohsin College, Estd. 1836
 Sitapur Endowment Senior Madrasah - is established in 1751 as a part of Sitapur endowmant.
 Hooghly Madrasah - Haji Muhammad Mohsin established in 1817.
 Furfura Fatehia Senior Madrasah Estd. 1902
 Government College of Engineering & Textile Technology Serampore
 Mahesh Sri Ramkrishna Ashram Vidyalaya (Higher Secondary)
Saroj Mohan Institute of Technology, Guptipara
 Serampore College
 Serampore Girls' College
 Serampore Union Institution
 Akna Girl's High School
 Chatra Nandalal Institution
 Mahesh High School, Serampore
 Hooghly Branch (Govt) School
 St Joseph's Convent, Chandannagar
 Balagarh Bijoy Krishna Mahavidyalaya (Jirat College), Jirat

Historical places 

 Tarakeswar is a renowned place of pilgrimage and the greatest centre of the Shiva sect in West Bengal. Taraknath Temple situated in Tarakeswar is famous in all over India. Construction of the country's first green university(Rani Rashmoni Green University) is underway at Tarakeswar. Apart from these, Tarakeswar is also famous for getting fresh vegetables, fruits, fish etc and various daily necessities at very low cost. 
 Serampore: The Ratha Yatra of Mahesh in Serampore is the oldest Ratha Yatra after Puri Ratha-Yatra. Serampore was the Danish colony. The first university in Asia was established in Serampore – Senate of Serampore College (University)
 Rishra: One of the most crowded cities has many different religions and industries like Aditya Birla's Jayashree textile. First jute mill of Asia was in Rishra. Arjuna Awardee Indian Footballer Sudhir Karmakar and Ex-Indian Football Captain Sishir Ghosh are from Rishra. Historical places to visit in Rishra Are Nilkuthi, Sidheshwari Kalibari, Bose House, Hesting jute mill, etc.
 Nalikul is famous for Raash Mela (রাস মেলা) & Rathayatra (রথযাত্রা) festivals. There is a big vegetable market.
 Bandel is famous for Bandel Church, West Bengal's oldest church. Bandel is the birthplace of the eminent writer Sarat Chandra Chattopadhyay.
 Chandannagar is an important town of Hooghly famous for Jagaddhatri puja, lighting work and French colonial monuments.
 Chinsurah is the district headquarters and a historical town of Hooghly. Bankim Chandra Chattopadhyay composed the "Vande Mataram," the national song of India, at Chinsurah. The Dutch villa is separated at Joraghat and Townguard. They are called 'Mondol Bari' as they are now under the aristocratic ownership of the Mondal family. One can see the Dutch lioness murals on the entrance doors and allied wooden motifs. In spite of such historical background, a major portion of the original Dutch villa at Townguard road, where once nationalist leaders used to hold meetings and conferences, was demolished and gone into the hands of builders/promoters. The back portion and the Joraghat Mondal house with Dutch acknowledgment are intact. The hierarchy of inheritance is becoming weak and the landmark assets need urgent preservation as well as heritage status application.
 Guptipara is famous for Rathayatra and Rashmela. There are few historical Terracotta temple in Brindabanchandra Math.
 The historical triple cities of Chandanagar-Chinsurah-Serampore are called Little Europe as these were all European colonies.
 Bansberia is famous for Hangseshwari Temple
Khanakul is the birthplace of Raja Ram Mohan Roy. It also famous for Ratnavali Temple, Gopinath Temple, Radhavallabh Temple, Ghontashor Temple. 
 Kamarpukur is the birthplace of Sri Sri Ramakrishna dev.
Rajbalhat is famous for Rajballavi Temple.
Antpur is a tourist place near Tarakeswar. 
Dasghara is a European wonderland in the heart of rural Bengal near Tarakeswar. It is a place where incongruity reigns as European-styled mansions co-exist with elaborate terracotta temples, as do well-laid out gardens, a clock tower and a Victorian style gateway. At present, the shooting of various movies and serials is done in Dasghara. 
Dhaniakhali known for the traditional handloom saris of West Bengal. 
 Bali Dewanganj is a village having beautiful old temples. The Rautpara neighbourhood alone has five temples with terracotta decorations.
 Tribeni is a Holy places for Hindu pilgrims. Here situates three river and one is our holy river Ganga. Jagannath Chatuspathi is one of the oldest Sanskrit educational institution.
Konnagar is the place where the first Bata Factory was set up.

Notable people 

This is a list of notable people from Hooghly District.
Sridhara was an Indian mathematician, Sanskrit pandit and philosopher. 
Panchanan Karmakar (Inventor of wooden Bengali alphabet typeface)
Anil Chatterjee (Bengali Actor) - born in Jirat.
Deb Bera (Deb Design Gallery) - born in SINGUR. He is a Graphics Designer. 
Brajendra Nath Seal - born in Haripal. He was a humanist philosopher.
Raja Ram Mohan Roy - born in Radhanagar. He is considered as the "Father of the Indian Renaissance". He was one of the founders of the Brahmo Sabha, the precursor of the Brahmo Samaj, a socio-religious (Hindu) reform movement in Undivided India.
Shib Chandra Deb- born in Konnagar. He was one of the leading Derozians, virtually the first generation of English-knowing Indians.
Nibaran Chandra Mukherjee- born in Hooghly District. He was a Brahmo reformer.
Haji Muhammad Mohsin- born in Hooghly District. He was a famous philanthropist. 
Satish Chandra Mukherjee - born in Banipur , Hooghly District.  He was a pioneer in establishing a system of national education in India. He was the father of Subroto Mukherjee. 
Subroto Mukherjee (related by ancestry) - He was the first Indian Commander-in-Chief (C-in-C) of the Indian Air Force. He was son of Satish Chandra Mukherjee.
Ganga Prasad Mukherjee- born in Jirat. He was a Physician. He was Sir Ashutosh Mukherjee's father.
Jagannath Tarka Panchanan- born in Tribeni. He was a legendary Sanskrit scholar and pundit of ancient Hindu Laws.
Ramakrishna- born in Kamarpukur. He was a Hindu mystic, saint, and religious leader in 19th century Bengal.
Nagendranath Basu- born in Mahesh. He was an archaeologist, encyclopaedist and a nationalist social historian of Bengal.
Amiya Chakravarty- born in Serampore. He was a literary critic, academic, and Bengali poet. He was a close associate of Rabindranath Tagore, and edited several books of his poetry. 
Ganapati Chakraborty- born in Serampore. He was a magician known for his mesmerizing tricks. He is considered to be the pioneer of modern magic in Bengal. He was the mentor of P. C. Sorcar and K Lal.
Rangalal Bandyopadhyay- born in Bakulia village of Hooghly District. His ancestral house was in Rameswarpur near Guptipara. He  was a Bengali poet, journalist, and author.
Kali Mirza- born in Guptipara. He was an 18th-century composer of tappā music in Bengal. A contemporary of Nidhu Babu, he composed over 400 tappās.
Swami Sri Yukteswar Giri- born in Serampore. He was an Indian monk and yogi, and the guru of Paramahansa Yogananda and Swami Satyananda Giri.
Nagendranath Chattopadhyay- born in Salepur village, approximately five miles from the sub-divisional headquarters in Arambagh. He was a noted Sanskrit scholar and grammarian.
Murari Mohan Mukherjee- His native place was Chinsurah. He was a plastic surgeon.
Krishna Chandra Bhattacharya- born in Serampore. He was a philosopher at the University of Calcutta known for his method of "constructive interpretation" through which relations and problematics of ancient Indian philosophical systems are drawn out and developed so that they can be studied like problems of modern philosophy.
Sisir Kumar Mitra- born in Konnagar. He was a physicist.
Madhusudan Gupta- born in Baidyabati. He was a translator and Ayurvedic practitioner who was also trained in Western medicine and is credited with having performed India's first human dissection at Calcutta Medical College (CMC) in 1836, almost 3,000 years after Susruta.
Prabhat Kumar Mukhopadhyay- born in Hughli. He was a Bengali Author.
Sarat Chandra Chattopadhyay- born in Debanandapur. He was a Bengali novelist and short story writer of the early 20th century.
Akshay Chandra Sarkar- born in Chinsurah. He was a poet, an editor and a literary critic of Bengali literature.
Raja Digambar Mitra- born in Konnagar. He was  one of the leading Derozians and first Bengali Sheriff of Kolkata.
Kanailal Dutta- born in Chandannagar. He was a revolutionary in India's freedom struggle belonging to the Jugantar group. 
Ashapurna Devi- Her ancestral village was Begumpur. She was a prominent Indian novelist and poet in Bengali language.
Brahmabandhav Upadhyay - born in Khanyan. He was a theologian, journalist and Indian freedom fighter. He was closely attached with Keshub Chandra Sen, classmate of Swami Vivekananda and close acquaintance of Rabindranath Tagore.
Ramnidhi Gupta- born in Chapta near Tribeni. He was commonly known as Nidhu Babu . He was one of the great reformers of Bengali tappā music.
Kirity Roy-  civil rights activist working in West Bengal
Motilal Roy - born in Chandannagar. He was a Bengali revolutionary, journalist, social reformer. He founded the "Prabartak Sangha", a nationalist organisation for social works.
Dwarka Nath Mitra- born in Augunsi. He belongs to the famous Mitra family of Janai. He was a famous lawyer and judge of the Calcutta High Court.
Nabagopal Mitra- He belonged to the famous Mitra Family of Konnagar.He was an Indian playwright, poet, essayist, patriot and one of the founding fathers of Hindu nationalism. He founded the Hindu Mela (which was inaugurated by Rajnarayan Basu ), the pioneer institution behind the genesis of Hindu nationalism. Mitra also founded National Press, National Paper, National Society, National School, National Theatre, National Store, National Gymnasium and National Circus, earning him the sobriquet 'National Mitra'.
Barindra Kumar Ghosh- He belonged to the famous Ghosh family of Konnagar. He was an Indian revolutionary and journalist. He was one of the founding members of "Jugantar" , a Bengali weekly, a revolutionary outfit in Bengal. Barindra Kumar Ghosh was the younger brother of Shri Aurobindo.
Manmohan Ghose- He belonged to the famous Ghosh family of Konnagar. He was an Indian poet and one of the first from India to write poetry in English. He was a brother of Sri Aurobindo.
Ashim Kumar Majhi born in Jirat, he is a politician.
Nirmal Jibon Ghosh - born in Dhamasin village, an Indian revolutionary and member of the Bengal Volunteers.
Premendra Mitra - Premendra Mitra belonged to the renowned Mitra family of Konnagar (in Hooghly district, West Bengal).
Surajit Dhara, recipient of the Shanti Swarup Bhatnagar Prize for Science and Technology for his contributions to physical sciences in 2020
Elora Tribedy, field archaeologist, Nalanda University

See also 
 Rathayatra of Mahesh, Serampore

Notes

References

External links 

 Hooghly District official homepage
 Hooghly specific information on West Bengal Portal
 Hooghly District map
 Hooghly District information

 
Districts of West Bengal